The Palais de la Porte Dorée (literally Palace of the Golden Gate) is an exhibit hall located on the edge of the Bois de Vincennes at 293, avenue Daumesnil, 12th arrondissement of Paris, France. It now houses the Musée de l'Histoire de l'Immigration, as well as a tropical aquarium in its cellar.

The building was constructed for the Paris Colonial Exposition of 1931 to designs by French architect Albert Laprade, Léon Jaussely and Léon Bazin.  It provides 16,000 m2 of exhibition and office space. External bas-reliefs (1200 m2) by sculptor Alfred Janniot portray ships, oceans, and wildlife including antelopes, elephants, zebras, and snakes.  The building's bas-reliefs and interior frescoes present an idealized version of colonialism that ignores colonialism's negative impacts.  The building is considered a landmark of Art Deco architecture.

The Palais de la Porte Dorée has housed a succession of ethnological museums, starting with the colonial exhibition of 1931, which was renamed in 1935 the Musée de la France d’Outre-mer, then in 1960 the Musée des Arts africains et océaniens, and finally in 1990 the Musée national des Arts d'Afrique et d'Océanie. In 2003 these collections were merged into the Musée du quai Branly, and in its place the building now houses the Cité nationale de l'histoire de l'immigration.

See also 
 List of museums in Paris

References

External links 

 Palais de la Porte Dorée - Cité nationale de l'histoire de l'immigration
 Aquarium Tropical, Palais de la Porte Dorée

Aquaria in Paris
Museums in Paris
National museums of France
Buildings and structures completed in 1931
Articles needing infobox zoo
Buildings and structures in the 12th arrondissement of Paris
Art Deco architecture in France
Paris Colonial Exposition